Farley Drew Caminetti (July 1, 1886 - December 19, 1945) was charged with violation of the Mann Act and his case was settled by the United States Supreme Court as Caminetti v. United States.

Biography
He was born on July 1, 1886 in California, the son of Anthony Caminetti, the Commissioner General of Immigration. He and Maury I. Diggs took their mistresses, Lola Norris and Marsha Warrington respectively, from Sacramento, California to Reno, Nevada. Their wives informed the police, and both men were arrested in Reno.

At trial on September 5, 1913, he was found guilty of one count of violation of the Mann Act. His case was argued before the United States Supreme Court starting on November 13, 1916 and ending on November 14, 1916. The court announced their decision on January 15, 1917, upholding his conviction.

He died on December 19, 1945.

References 

1886 births
1945 deaths
People from Sacramento, California
People convicted of violating the Mann Act